The Kosovska Mitrovica District is a de jure district in Autonomous Province of Kosovo and Metohija. It is located in the northern part of Kosovo and Metohija. It had a population of 275,904. Seat of the District is in the city of Kosovska Mitrovica. From one point of view of the Serbian government the district de jure still exist, despite the fact that Serbian government accepted civil UN administration over Kosovo.

Municipalities

It included the municipalities of:

Zubin Potok
Leposavić
Zvečan
Kosovska Mitrovica
Srbica
Vučitrn

Culture and history

Kosovska Mitrovica, being a medieval settlement, is rich in famous edifices and monuments: the Church of St. Dimitri originating from the fourteenth century, and the Church of St. Sava from the nineteenth century. In the vicinity of Kosovska Mitrovica is the Devič Monastery, the first mention of which was found in 1578.

References

Note: All official material made by Government of Serbia is public by law. Information was taken from official website.

Districts in Kosovo and Metohija
North Kosovo